Hon. Thomas Otto Bishop MLC (1877 – 1 May 1952) was a New Zealand politician of the National Party.

Biography
He was appointed to the New Zealand Legislative Council in 1943, and was Speaker from 15 March 1950 until it was abolished on 31 December 1950 by the First National Government.

He emigrated from Nottingham, England to Otago, where he qualified as an Associate in the Otago School of Mines. He joined the civil service for ten years, becoming Undersecretary of the Mines Department in 1918. He resigned and became Secretary of the New Zealand Employers’ Association.

Bishop was married with three daughters, and died in Lower Hutt on 1 May 1952, aged 75 years. He was cremated at Karori Crematorium the following day.

References

1877 births
1952 deaths
Speakers of the New Zealand Legislative Council
New Zealand National Party MLCs
Members of the New Zealand Legislative Council